At-Tur  (The Mount) is the 52nd chapter (sūrah) of the Quran with 49 verses (ayat). The surah opens with the oath of the Allah swearing by the Mount, which some believe is Mount Sinai, where the Tawrat was revealed to Musa. The chapter takes its name from "the mount" (ṭūr) mentioned in verse 1. 

The surah addresses many of the arguments put to the Prophet by the disbelievers of Mecca (verse 29 ff.). The bliss that will be enjoyed by the believers is contrasted to the torments of Hell, and the Prophet is urged to bide his time, to continue to deliver his message, and to wait with confidence for God's judgement. God swears by, among other things, Mount Sinai, that the Day of Judgement is inevitable.

Summary
1-8 Oaths by various objects that the judgment-day will come
9-16 The terrors of the unbelievers in that day
17-28 The bliss of Paradise described
29-34 Muhammad not a soothsayer, madman, poet, or impostor
35-47 Unbelievers reproved for their ignorance and idolatry 
42-43 Plots of the enemies of Muhammad exposed 
44-47 Muhammad to leave the idolaters to their fate
48-49 Muhammad exhorted to praise and trust the Lord

References

External links
Q52:1, 50+ translations, islamawakened.com

Tur
Sacred mountains
Hebrew Bible mountains
Midian
Moses